Tolar or Jáchymovský tolar is the Czech name for the silver coin minted in Kingdom of Bohemia from 1520 until 1672 in Jáchymov (German: Joachimsthal).  On obverse of the coin is depicted Saint Joachim with coat-of-arms of the noble family Schlik, who founded the mint in Ore mountains, with  titles of brothers Schlicks in inscription:"STEPHANI:ET:FRATRVM: COMITVM:DE:BASSANO" (without abbreviations). On reverse side is depicted the crowned Bohemian lion with title of the Bohemian King Louis of Jagiellonian dynasty:  (without abbreviations):"LVDOVICVS DEI GRACIA REX BOHEMIAE".     

The modern word dollar was derived from the Spanish dollar, so-called in the English-speaking world because they were of similar size and weight to the German Thalers. The German Thalers were so named because they were first minted from a silver mine in 1520 in Joachimsthal. 

It was the main silver currency in Bohemia from 1520 to 1750.

See also

 Slovenian tolar, the currency of Slovenia from 1991 to 2006.

References

External links

Numismatics
Habsburg Bohemia
Czech words and phrases